was a statesman, politician and cabinet minister in Taishō and early Shōwa period Japan.

Biography
Mochizuki was born on Ōsakikamijima, an island in the Seto Inland Sea, now part of Hiroshima Prefecture, where his father was an entrepreneur and ship owner. He went to Tokyo when he was age 13 and studied the English language, returning at age 17 to assist in the family business. However, he soon became interested in politics and was affiliated with the early Liberal Party of Japan. He was elected to the lower house of the Diet of Japan in the 1898 General Election, and was subsequently reelected from the same district 13 times.

In his early career, Mochizuki spoke out strongly against factionalism in the Diet based on old clan-based affiliations. He later joined the Kenseitō political party, but was recruited as one of the founding members of the Rikken Seiyūkai by Itō Hirobumi in 1900. He rose to a high rank within the party, eventually serving as secretary-general during the administration of Prime Minister Hara Kei.

Mochizuki first joined the Cabinet under the Tanaka administration in 1927 as Minister of Communications. The following year, he was appointed Home Minister.

During his term as Home Minister, renewed activity by underground Japan Communist Party in 1928 led to the March 15 Incident, in which police arrested more than 1,600 Communists and suspected Communists under the provisions of the Public Safety Preservation Law of 1925. The same year, he pushed through an amendment to the law, raising the maximum penalty from ten years to death.

Also while Home Minister in 1927, Mochizuki responded to a petition by pioneering Japanese feminist Shidzue Katō on women's suffrage by telling her to go home to wash her baby's diapers, as the place for women is in the home.

However, Mochizuki broke with the Seiyūkai in 1934, forming the short-lived Showa-kai party in 1935. He returned to the cabinet as Minister of Communications from 1935–1936, and served as a Cabinet councilor during the Yonai administration in 1940.

Mochizuki died just before the start of the Pacific War. His birthplace in Ōsakikamijima has been preserved as a museum. His grave is at the Tama Cemetery.

References
 Henderson, Michael. All Her Paths are Peace:Women Pioneers in Peacemaking. Kumarian Press (1994). 
 Hunter, Janet.  A Concise Dictionary of Modern Japanese History . University of California Press (1994).

External links

National Diet Library biography

Notes

 

1867 births
1941 deaths
People from Hiroshima Prefecture
Kenseitō politicians
Rikken Seiyūkai politicians
Members of the House of Representatives (Empire of Japan)
Government ministers of Japan
Ministers of Home Affairs of Japan